199th Division may refer to:

199th Motorized Infantry Brigade, formerly the 199th Division within the People's Liberation Army
199th Infantry Division (German Empire)
199th Infantry Division (Wehrmacht)

Military units and formations disambiguation pages